Payson may refer to:

Places in the United States 
 Payson, Arizona
 Payson, Illinois
 Payson, Utah

People
 Edward Payson (1783–1827), American Congregational preacher
  (1893–1927), American botanist
 Harold Payson (1928–2011), U.S. boatbuilder and designer
 Joan Whitney Payson (1903–1975), American businesswoman and New York Mets owner
 Phillips Payson (1704–1778), American minister for the town of Dorchester, Massachusetts from 1728
 Samuel Phillips Payson (1736–1801), American minister for the town of Chelsea, Massachusetts from 1757
 William Farquhar Payson (1876–1939), notable American author
William P. Richardson (law school dean) (1864–1945), American co-founder and first Dean of Brooklyn Law School